Herstik, Hershtik is a Jewish family and surname Magyarized from :

 Gustav Herstik
 Moshe Menachem Herstik, a chazzan
 Naftali Hershtik, a Hungarian-Israeli chazzan
 Netanel Herstik, a chazzan
 Shraga Herstik, a chazzan
 Ron Herstik, rabbi, founder of Dor Ḥadash
Les Herstik, speed skier

References 

Jewish surnames
Germanic-language surnames
Jewish families
Hungarian families
Israeli Jews
Hungarian Jews
Surnames of Hungarian origin